Bide may refer to:
 Bïde, an indigenous people of Brazil
 Bïde language, a language of Brazil
 BIDE model, a model used in population ecology
 Austin Bide (1915–2008), British chemist and industrialist
 Bao Bide (born 1948), American historian and sinologist
 Bide Dudley (1877–1944), American critic and playwright

See also 
 Sass & bide, a fashion label
 Bidet